The Underground Comedy Movie is a 1999 film directed by and starring Vince Offer. Alongside short comedy sketches it features music by NOFX and Guttermouth, among others.  It is considered by some as one of the worst films of all time.

Synopsis
The film mainly consists of skits featuring celebrities in various roles, based on concepts Offer had originally performed on a public-access television  show he had hosted. Skits included Gena Lee Nolin posing as Marilyn Monroe, supermodels loudly using the restroom, and a superhero named "Dickman" who dressed in a penis costume and defeated his enemies by squirting them with semen.

Cast
Supermodels Taking a Dump
 Barbara Snellenburg as Supermodel #1
 Rebecca Chaney as Supermodel #2

Bat Man
 Gloria Sperling as Old Lady
 Sam Costello as Security Guard
 Chris Watson as Rhymer
 Vince Offer as Batman

Boobwatch
 Karen Black as Mother
 Brian Van Holt as Lifeguard

Virgin Hunter
 Lightfield Lewis as Virgin Hunter
 Barbara Snellenburg as Virgin

Gay Virgin
 Ant as Gay Man
 Michael Clarke Duncan as Gay Virgin

I Hate L.A.
 Vince Offer, David Rotter, and Danny Rotter as Singers
 Jeffrey Jaeger as Transvestite

The Godmother
 Michael "Wheels" Parisi as Godmother
 Joey Buttafuoco as Sonny
 Vince Offer as Fetus Salesman

The Adventures of Dickman
 Peachy Keene as Lesbian #1
 Melanie Pullen as Lesbian #2
 Rebecca Chaney as Lesbian #3

Watts Up Talk Show
 Vince Offer as JJ Cool
 Morgan Alvet as KKK

Psychology Today
 Zoska Myock as Patient
 Michael "Wheels" Parisi as Psychologist

Beautiful Girl With Old Man
 Barbara Snellenburg as Beautiful Girl
 George Smity as Old Man

Miss America Bag Lady Pageant
 Slash as Host
 Rebecca Chaney as Co-host

Flirty Harry
 Tony Vera as Bad Guy
 Vince Offer as Flirty

Porno Review
 Bobby Lee as Chinese Man
 Paolo Scandarisi as Arnold Swollenpecker
 Sam Costell as Mailman
 Vince Offer as Vincenzo Butafungu
 Sam Mactaggert as Spanky Shvatsa
 Joe Shapiro as Man-goo Man/Tutu Girl

Jury Making Right Decision
 Jerry "Mongo" Brown as Black Juror #1
 Ella Mae Davis as Black Juror # 2
 Mike Boito as White Juror #1
 Lightfield Lewis as White Juror #2

Marilyn Monroe
 Gena Lee Nolin as Marilyn
 Sam Costello as Bystander #1
 Joe Shapiro as Bystander #2

Production
Although the film was released and screened in 1999, Offer was bankrupt by 2002 and home video distribution plans were shelved. Offer, who had previously been a successful vegetable chopper salesman and businessman, resumed selling vegetable choppers at swap meets to support himself and raise money to complete his film project. Within a few months, he had earned enough to resume production, and the movie was finally completed, released, and marketed entirely on late-night infomercials that Offer paid for with his earnings from the swap meet vegetable chopper sales.

The film has reportedly sold in excess of 100,000 copies.

Reception
According to IMDb, The Underground Comedy Movie played on one movie theater screen on May 16, 1999, earning $856.

The film earned less-than-favorable reviews, receiving a 33% from Rotten Tomatoes based on 6 reviews. The New York Post said it "may be the least amusing comedy ever made." Lawrence Van Gelder of The New York Times offered a scathing review, describing the movie as "a series of sketches built around subjects like masturbation, defecation, alienation, urination, necrophilia, voyeurism, casual brutality, and mockery of the unfortunate." Van Gelder added that tasteless or offensive material can be funny in the right hands, but that Offer "makes the common mistake of equating the recognition of comic potential for comedy itself. For the successful, talent bridges the gap, but, here, [talent] is absent."

Lawsuits

The film was the subject of several lawsuits filed by Offer against others. On September 23, 1998, Vince Offer filed a suit against 20th Century Fox and the co-directors of There's Something About Mary, Bobby and Peter Farrelly. Offer claimed that 14 scenes in Mary were lifted from his film. The Farrellys released this statement: "We've never heard of him, we've never heard of his movie, and it's all a bunch of baloney." The case was dismissed with prejudice on a motion for summary judgment by order of the court in 2000, and 20th Century Fox was awarded $66,336.92 in attorneys' fees.

In 2000, Offer successfully sued Anna Nicole Smith for $4 million, claiming that Smith had agreed to be in his movie, but backed out in 1996 over fears that appearing in the movie would be detrimental to her career.

In 2004, Offer sent out a press release through prnewsonline.com announcing his intention to sue the Church of Scientology. In 1997, while production was ongoing, the Church of Scientology had allegedly begun a large-scale smear campaign against Offer and his film (Offer was a Scientologist at the time).
The director claimed the Scientologists' "Celebrity Centre" in Hollywood labeled him a "criminal" (based on the rules of Scientology) and threatened his Scientology friends in the movie business with "condemnation" punishment that could be lethal to their careers if they did not write malicious reports against Offer.

Sequel
In June 2010, it was revealed that Offer had completed filming of scenes starring Lindsay Lohan and model Joanna Krupa for a follow-up movie. The film was released in 2013 with the title InAPPropriate Comedy.

References

External links
 Underground Comedy 2010 – official promotional site
 

1999 comedy films
1999 direct-to-video films
1999 films
American independent films
American comedy films
Scientology-related controversies in film
Sketch comedy films
1990s English-language films
1999 directorial debut films
1990s American films